, also known as , was an aristocratic Confucian scholar and Buddhist monk in late Heian period Japan. He was one of the chief advisors to Emperor Nijō, and one of the chief allies of Taira no Kiyomori, particularly during the Heiji Rebellion of 1159.

As the head of the leading faction at Court, Shinzei enjoyed access to the emperor and other privileges which his rival Fujiwara no Nobuyori envied. In early 1160, Shinzei's ally Taira no Kiyomori left the capital with much of his family, thus providing Nobuyori's faction (and his allies, the Minamoto clan) to make a move for power. Some believe this may have been intentional on Kiyomori's part, laying a trap for the Minamoto.

Nobuyori and the Minamoto set fire to the Sanjō Palace and abducted both Emperor Nijō and the cloistered Emperor Go-Shirakawa. They then turned on Shinzei's home, destroying it and killing all those inside, with the exception of Shinzei himself, who escaped only to be captured in the mountains near Kyoto and decapitated soon afterward.

References

Reischauer, Edwin O., and Joseph K. Yamagiwa, eds. and trans. (1951). Translations from Early Japanese Literature.  Cambridge, Mass.: Harvard University Press.  Includes a partial translation of Heiji monogatari, an account of the Heiji Rebellion.

1106 births
1160 deaths
Fujiwara clan
People of Heian-period Japan
Heian period Buddhist clergy